Nicholas Saliba (born 26 August 1966 in Malta) is a former professional footballer who played almost his whole career with Maltese Premier League side Valletta, where he played as a midfielder.

Career statistics

International goals

Honours
Valletta
 1989/90, 1991/92, 1996/97, 1997/98, 1998/99, 2000/01 Maltese Premier League

References

External links
 Nicky Saliba at MaltaFootball.com
 

Living people
1966 births
Maltese footballers
Malta international footballers
Msida Saint-Joseph F.C. players
Valletta F.C. players
Association football midfielders